Jeanette Laura Sterke is a British actress.

Sterke was born in Prague, Czechoslovakia.  Her parents emigrated to England to escape the Nazis.  She went to school in England and attended RADA.  She has had a long stage and television career. She was married to the actor Keith Michell. They had a son, Paul, and a daughter Helena.

Filmography

Television

References

External links
 

Living people
Alumni of RADA
English stage actresses
English television actresses
English film actresses
Actresses from Prague
Czechoslovak emigrants to England
Czech emigrants to England
Year of birth missing (living people)